John Durnin (born 10 November 1894) was a Scottish footballer who played for Partick Thistle and Dumbarton.

References

1894 births
Scottish footballers
Dumbarton F.C. players
Partick Thistle F.C. players
Scottish Football League players
Year of death missing
Association football midfielders